Events from the year 1881 in France.

Incumbents
President: Jules Grévy 
President of the Council of Ministers: Jules Ferry (until 14 November), Charles de Freycinet (starting 14 November)

Events
 13 February – First issue of the feminist newspaper La Citoyenne is published by Hubertine Auclert.
 23 March – A fire caused by a gas explosion destroys the Opéra de Nice with fatalities.
 12 May – Treaty of Bardo is signed between the French Republic and Tunisian bey Muhammed as-Sadiq. Tunisia becomes a French protectorate.
 29 July – Law on the Freedom of the Press passed.

Births
 11 January – Lucien Rosengart, engineer (died 1976)
 21 January – André Godard, archeologist and architect (died 1965)
 19 February – Paul Tournon, architect (died 1964)
 20 February – Julien Maitron, cyclist (died 1972)
 21 February – Marc Boegner, theologist, pastor, French Resistance member and essayist (died 1970)
 18 March – Paul Le Flem, composer and musician (died 1984)
 23 March – Roger Martin du Gard, author, winner of the 1937 Nobel Prize for Literature (died 1958)
 12 April – Élisée Maclet, painter (died 1962)
 1 May - Pierre Teilhard de Chardin, paleontologist, Jesuit priest (died 1955)
 21 June – Camille Drevet, anti-colonialist, feminist and pacifist activist (died 1969)
 27 June – Jérôme Carcopino, historian and author (died 1970)
 29 July – Paul Couturier, priest and promoter of the concept of Christian unity (died 1953)
 7 August – François Darlan, Admiral (died 1942)
 10 October – Gaston Ragueneau, athlete and Olympic medallist (died 1978)
 4 November – Gaby Deslys, dancer and actress (died 1920)
 8 November – Robert Esnault-Pelterie, pioneering aircraft designer (died 1957)
 5 December – René Cresté, actor and director (died 1922)
 12 December - Louise Thuliez, resistance fighter in World War I and World War II (died 1966)

Deaths
 19 January – Auguste Mariette, scholar and archaeologist (born 1821)
 13 February – Alexis Paulin Paris, scholar and author (born 1800)
 17 February – Emile-Justin Menier, pharmaceutical manufacturer, chocolatier, and politician (born 1826).
 1 March – Édouard Drouyn de Lhuys, statesman and diplomat (born 1805)
 24 March – Achille Ernest Oscar Joseph Delesse, geologist and mineralogist (born 1817)
 26 March – Jules Achille Noël, painter (born 1815)
 4 April – Napoléon Peyrat, author and historian (born 1809)
 27 April – Émile de Girardin, journalist, publicist and politician (born 1802)
 2 June
 Émile Littré, lexicographer and philosopher (born 1801)
 Pierre Louis Rouillard, sculptor (born 1820)
 28 June – Jules Armand Dufaure, statesman (born 1798)
 9 July – Paul Bins, comte de Saint-Victor, author (born 1827)
 21 December – Édouard Dulaurier, Orientalist and Egyptologist (born 1807)

References

1880s in France